Digri railway station 
(Sindhi: ڊگهڙي ريلوي اسٽيشن) is  located in Sindh,  Pakistan.

See also
 List of railway stations in Pakistan
 Pakistan Railways

References

External links

Railway stations in Pakistan